Thomas Muster defeated Andrei Chesnokov in the final, 6–1, 6–3, 6–1 to win the men's singles tennis title at the 1990 Italian Open.

Alberto Mancini was the defending champion, but lost to Chesnokov in the quarterfinals.

Seeds

Draw

Finals

Top half

Section 1

Section 2

Bottom half

Section 3

Section 4

References
1990 Peugeot Italian Open Draw

1990 Italian Open (tennis)